The Chifley Research Centre is the Australian Labor Party’s official think tank.

Objectives & Activities

Aims 
Its stated aim is to "the advancement of public policy debate and progressive thinking in Australia." The Centre promotes policy debate and discussion in universities and political and industrial forums, commissions academic research, provides strategic policy advice to the Federal Parliamentary Labor Party, and works with other intellectual bodies to promote better understanding of the Australian political and policy environment.

Progressive Australia Conference 
Progressive Australia is a bi-annual conference and series of events that the Centre has run since 2011, which aim to "renew Australia’s progressive values and to rebuild the progressive movement."

Labor History 
Labor History is a project that the Centre runs, which "seeks to educate and engage the Australian people in the history and stories of the Australia Labor Party."This project is attempting to bring together the largest single resource on the ALP to help users gain an understanding of the ALP as a whole.
It traces the history of the Australian Labor Party from its inception in the 1890s to the Hawke period of the 1990s. Users can also share their own stories and experiences to add to the collection and to stand as a testament to those who have contributed to the development of Australia.

Funding 
The Chifley Research Centre is supported by the Commonwealth Government through a grant in aid administered by the Department of Finance and Deregulation. It has Deductible Gift Recipient status under the Income Tax Act 1997.

See also 

 Liberal Party of Australia: Menzies Research Centre
 National Party of Australia: Page Research Centre
 Australian Democrats: Don Chipp Foundation
 Australian Greens Party The Green Institute

References

External links
Chifley Research Centre

Think tanks based in Australia
Australian Labor Party
Australian labour movement